Deadfall is an original novel by Gary Russell  featuring the fictional archaeologist Bernice Summerfield. The New Adventures were a spin-off from the long-running British science fiction television series Doctor Who.

Deadfall was the first of the post-Doctor Who New Adventures not to be centred on Bernice Summerfield. Instead, the main characters are Jason Kane (Benny's ex-husband) and Chris Cwej, both previously introduced in the Doctor Who New Adventures, and Emile Mars-Smith, previously introduced in an earlier post-Doctor Who New Adventure, Beyond the Sun. The Knights of Jeneve, an organisation introduced in the post-Doctor Who New Adventure Dragons' Wrath but related to the Doctor Who organisation UNIT, also feature.

Elements of the plot were re-used from Russell's play of the same name in the fan fiction Audio Visuals series (written under the pseudonym Warren Martyn).

1997 British novels
1997 science fiction novels
Virgin New Adventures
Novels by Gary Russell